Christophe Remy (born 6 August 1971) is a French former professional footballer who played for AJ Auxerre, Derby County, and Oxford United.

Career

France
Remy played 28 games for AJ Auxerre from 1989-1996, when he transferred to Derby County.

England
Described as urbane and calm on the ball, Remy missed part of 1997–98 due to injury, losing his position to right-back Les Robinson. However, coach Malcolm Shotton announced that he would 'start from scratch', not based on the last season's performances. Despite expressing gratitude at the idea, the Frenchman was ruled out from the U's 1998/99 opener but was on target on 21 February even though Oxford went down 2-1 to Ipswich Town, dedicating his goal to his newborn son, Lucas.

References

External links 
 
 
 

Expatriate footballers in England
Oxford United F.C. players
AJ Auxerre players
Association football defenders
Derby County F.C. players
1971 births
Living people
French footballers
French expatriate footballers
English Football League players